Moja may refer to:

People
 Federico Moja (1802–1885), Italian painter
 Giuseppe Moja (1915–2009), Salesian priest and missionary in India
 Hella Moja (1896–1951), German screenwriter, film producer and film actress

Other
 Moja (chimpanzee)
 Möja, Sweden
 Moja TV, Bosnian IPTV provider
 Movement for Justice in Africa

See also
 
 Moya (disambiguation)